Pain Killer is the fourth studio album by Japanese pop duo moumoon. It was released on January 30, 2013 in 4 different editions.

Editions
The album was released in four editions:

CD+Blu-ray: The CD+Blu-ray edition include the album with standard track list, a Blu-ray disc including the live specials "Moumoon Studio Live 2013", "Moumoon Live History", the music videos of "Midori no Michi" and "Utsukushii Hito", and a special making from the album. The first press edition comes with a different apple jacket cover.
CD+2DVD: The CD+2DVD edition include the album with standard track list, two DVDs including the live specials "Moumoon Studio Live 2013", "Moumoon Live History" on the disc 1 and the music videos of "Midori no Michi" and "Utsukushii Hito", and a special making from the album on the disc 2. The first press edition comes with a different apple jacket cover.
CD only: The CD only edition will the album only with an acoustic version of the song "Flowers" as bonus track.
Fanclub edition: The Fanclub edition include the album with standard track list, two DVDs including the live specials "Moumoon Studio Live 2013", "Moumoon Live History" on the disc 1 and the music videos of "Midori no Michi" and "Utsukushii Hito", and a special making from the album on the disc 2. It also includes a special booklet and a different jacket cover.

Singles
Four songs of the album were released as singles:

The first single, "Love is Everywhere", was released on March 14, 2012 and peaked number 33 in Oricon's weekly singles chart. The song was used as theme song for the Canon's IXY TV advertisement.

The second single, "Hanabi", was released on August 29, 2012 and peaked number 29 in Oricon's weekly singles chart. The song was used as image song for the event Natsu Matsuri Hanabi Taikai.

The third and last single, "Dreamer Dreamer" / "Doko e mo Ikanai yo" is a double A-side single released on December 12, 2012 and peaked number 30 in Oricon's weekly singles chart. The song "Doko e mo Ikanai yo" was used as ending theme song for the TV drama Yuusha Yoshihiko to Akuryo no Kagi and the song "Midori no Michi", used as b-side of the single, was used as theme song for the short movie Heather Love ♡ Short Movies. All songs from the single were included on the album.

Promotions
Beside the singles, two songs included on the album were used in movies and TV shows. The song "Vanitas" was used as theme song for Fuji TV's drama Dolce. The song was later released digitally on October 10, 2012. The song "Utsukushii Hito" was used as theme song for the movie Little Maesutora.

Track listing

Charts
The album debuted at number 8 on its first day of chart on Oricon and it climbed to number 4 on its second day.

Oricon chart

Release history

References

2013 albums
Japanese-language albums
Moumoon albums